David Luca Durante (born June 26, 1980) is an American artistic gymnast. He is the 2007 U.S. All-Around champion and was one of the three alternates to the 2008 Summer Olympics. He competed at the 2007 World Artistic Gymnastics Championships and was a member of the 4th-place-finishing American team. Durante holds dual American-Italian citizenship.

Durante graduated from Stanford University in 2002 with a major in human biology and a minor in psychology.

References
 
 

1980 births
Living people
American male artistic gymnasts
People from Garwood, New Jersey
American people of Italian descent
Stanford University alumni
Gymnasts at the 2003 Pan American Games
Gymnasts at the 2007 Pan American Games
Pan American Games silver medalists for the United States
Pan American Games bronze medalists for the United States
Pan American Games medalists in gymnastics
Medalists at the 2003 Pan American Games
Medalists at the 2007 Pan American Games
Stanford Cardinal men's gymnasts
21st-century American people